Michael Handler Ruby is an American poet and longtime editor at The Wall Street Journal. As a poet, he has primarily identified with surrealism, Language poetry and the New York School, including Bernadette Mayer, whose early books he co-edited.

Life and career

Ruby is the son of Myron Ruby and Judith Handler; he had a brother, Sandy Ruby.
 
Ruby majored in English and American literature at Harvard College, worked on both campus poetry magazines, padan aram and The Harvard Advocate, and was elected to Phi Beta Kappa in 1979. He studied early American literature with Alan Heimert and poetry with  Jane Shore, Alan Williamson, Robert Fitzgerald and Seamus Heaney. He also was part of a group associated with novelist and conspiracy theorist Harold L. Humes. After studying languages in Italy and France and working as a substitute teacher in the Boston public schools, he received an MA in poetry writing in 1983 from Brown University, where he studied with Keith Waldrop. He lived with the poet Cynthia Zarin during much of that time.

He started working as a financial journalist and settled in the Park Slope neighborhood of Brooklyn in 1984. Since 1986, he has worked as an editor at The Wall Street Journal in Manhattan, initially covering technology and health, and later U.S. news and politics.

His first book, At an Intersection, a selection of poems from the 1980s and early 1990s, was published in 2002. In his next published book, Window on the City, Ruby turned to a form of automatic writing that he called “surrealist at the level of each word or phrase, as opposed to surrealist at the level of the image or narrative, the predominant surrealist approaches,” in a 2014 interview in The Conversant. He continued that approach in The Mouth of the Bay, written over many years on the Maine coast. His 2010 book, Compulsive Words, is based on the experience of a group of words "taking over the poem," a subject he has continued to explore. He is best known for the 2013 publication American Songbook, with poems based on 75 recordings of American singers from the 1920s to 1999. A closely related book, The Star-Spangled Banner, with poems based on the words of the U.S. national anthem, was excerpted in a chapbook in 2011 and published in 2020.

During the same years, Ruby wrote a series of books in prose and poetry that chronicled dreams, memories, inner voices and visions. The first three books— Fleeting Memories, Dreams of the 1990s and the hypnagogic Inner Voices Heard Before Sleep—were published as the trilogy Memories, Dreams and Inner Voices in 2012. A subsequent hypnagogic book, Close Your Eyes, was excerpted in a chapbook in 2013 and published as an ebook in 2018.

Starting in 2010, Ruby has worked on editorial projects for Station Hill Press in Barrytown, New York, including co-editing with Sam Truitt Eating the Colors of a Lineup of Words: The Early Books of Bernadette Mayer.

Ruby has co-written memoirs about the Supreme Court with his great uncle Milton Handler, and he edited the writings of his half-brother David Herfort, a poet who served in jail and then died in a car accident in Spain at the age of 22.

Other notable relatives of Ruby include his stepfather, chemist Eli M. Pearce; his aunt,  foreign-policy expert Antonia Handler Chayes.

Works

Books
The Star-Spangled Banner. Barrytown, N.Y.: Station Hill Press, 2020
The Mouth of the Bay. Buffalo: BlazeVOX [books], 2019
American Songbook. Brooklyn: Ugly Duckling Presse, 2013
Memories, Dreams and Inner Voices. Barrytown, N.Y.: Station Hill Press, 2012 (a trilogy)
Compulsive Words. Buffalo: BlazeVOX [books], 2010
The Edge of the Underworld. Buffalo: BlazeVOX [books], 2010
Window on the City. Buffalo: BlazeVOX [books], 2006
At an Intersection. New York: Alef Books, 2002

Ebooks
Titles & First Lines. Jacksonville, Fla.: Mudlark, 2018
Close Your Eyes. Liverpool, U.K.: Argotist Online, 2018
Inner Voices Heard Before Sleep. Liverpool, U.K.: Argotist Online, 2011
Fleeting Memories. Brooklyn, N.Y.: Ugly Duckling, 2008
First Names. Jacksonville, Fla.: Mudlark, 2004

Chapbooks
Poems for Texts for Nothing, a collaboration with Nancy Graham. Kingston, R.I.: Dusie Kollektiv, 2019
Coastal Elements. Kingston, R.I.: Dusie, 2015
Foghorns. Kingston, R.I.: Dusie, 2014
Close Your Eyes. Zurich, Switzerland: Dusie, 2013
The Star-Spangled Banner. Zurich, Switzerland: Dusie, 2011

Editing projects

Piece of Cake by Bernadette Mayer and Lewis Warsh. Co-edited with Sam Truitt. Barrytown, N.Y.: Station Hill Press, 2019
Eating the Colors of a Lineup of Words: The Early Books of Bernadette Mayer. Co-edited with Sam Truitt. Barrytown, N.Y.: Station Hill Press, 2015 
Washtenaw County Jail and Other Writings by David Herfort. Philadelphia: Xlibris, 2005

Reviews

Dan Chiasson wrote of American Songbook: “Ruby’s poems are ‘American songs’ in their transformation of tune into ‘sound,’ noise, traffic, as well as their loneliness (he calls to mind Edward Hopper and the early Eliot of ‘Preludes’)…. They are also, in their broken way, up-to-date, streetwise.”
Jerome Rothenberg wrote on the back cover of trilogy Memories, Dreams and Inner Voices: “His project here—to explore ‘the varieties of unconscious experience’ as they come to him—is an aspect of what Gary Snyder once described as ‘the real work of modern man: to uncover the inner structure and actual boundaries of the mind.’”

References

Living people
Surrealist poets
New York School poets
Language poets
Harvard College alumni
Brown University alumni
Writers from Brooklyn
The Wall Street Journal people
American male poets
20th-century American male writers
21st-century American male writers
American male journalists
20th-century American poets
21st-century American poets
Jewish American poets
1957 births
21st-century American Jews